Jim Grabb and Richey Reneberg were the defending champions, but none competed this year. Reneberg competed at Queen's in the same week.

Patrick McEnroe and Jonathan Stark won the title by defeating David Adams and Andrei Olhovskiy 7–6, 1–6, 6–4 in the final.

Seeds

Draw

Draw

References

External links
 Official results archive (ATP)
 Official results archive (ITF)

Rosmalen Grass Court Championships
1993 ATP Tour